The Dictionary of the Middle Ages  is a 13-volume encyclopedia of the Middle Ages published by the American Council of Learned Societies between 1982 and 1989. It was first conceived and started in 1975 with American medieval historian Joseph Strayer  of Princeton University as editor-in-chief. A "Supplement 1" was added in 2003 under the editorship of William Chester Jordan.

The encyclopedia covers over 112,000 persons, places, things and concepts of "legitimate scholarly interest" in 7,000 distinct articles in more than 8,000 pages written by over 1,800 contributing editors from academic institutions mainly in the United States but also Europe and Asia.

It is the largest and most detailed modern encyclopedia of the Middle Ages in the English language, comparable to the nine volume German Lexikon des Mittelalters.

The "upside-down-T in a circle" symbol on the spine and cover is an artistic interpretation of the T and O map, which was first described in the Etymologiae, the most influential encyclopedic work of the Middle Ages.

Notes

References
Joseph Strayer, editor (1989). Dictionary of the Middle Ages. Charles Scribner's Sons.  OCLC 8474388
William Chester Jordan, editor (2003). Dictionary of the Middle Ages: Supplement 1. Charles Scribner's Sons. 

Encyclopedias of history
Medieval studies literature
1982 non-fiction books
American encyclopedias
English-language encyclopedias